Modifier Tone Letters is a Unicode block containing tone markings for Chinese, Chinantec, Africanist, and other phonetic transcriptions. It does not contain the standard IPA tone marks, which are found in Spacing Modifier Letters.

 are used to mark yin and (underlined) yang splits of the ping, shang, qu and ru tones, respectively, in the etymological four-tone analysis of Chinese. The dotted tone letters  are used for the pitch of neutral tones, while the reversed tone letters  and neutral  are used for tone sandhi.  are used in Ozumacín Chinantec.  are the IPA diacritics for upstep and downstep, while  are substitutes people used before broad font support of the IPA, and still preferred by some.  can also be used for superscript modifiers.

Block

History
The following Unicode-related documents record the purpose and process of defining specific characters in the Modifier Tone Letters block:

See also 
 Phonetic symbols in Unicode

References 

Unicode blocks